{|

{{Infobox ship characteristics
|Hide header=
|Header caption=
|Ship class=
|Ship displacement=*2,966 tonnes
5,260 tonnes fully loaded
|Ship length= (172 French feet)
|Ship beam= (44' 6)
|Ship draught= (22 French feet)
|Ship speed=
|Ship range=
|Ship endurance=
|Ship test depth=
|Ship boats=
|Ship capacity=
|Ship complement=678 men
|Ship armament=*74 guns:
Lower gundeck: 28 × 36-pounder long guns
Upper gundeck: 30 × 24-pounder long guns
Forecastle and quarterdeck:
16 × 8-pounder long guns
4 × 36-pounder carronades
|Ship armour=Timber
|Ship motto=
|Ship nickname=
|Ship honours=
|Ship notes=
|Ship badge=
}}
|}
The Suffren was a  74-gun ship of the line of the French Navy.Suffren took part in Allemand's expedition of 1805 under Captain Amable Troude.

She operated in the Mediterranean until the end of the First Empire, and was decommissioned shortly thereafter.Suffren'' was razeed in 1816, and used as a prison hulk on Toulon harbour.

She was eventually broken up in 1823.

Sources and references
 Ships of the line

Ships of the line of the French Navy
Téméraire-class ships of the line
1803 ships